Symposiachrus is a genus of birds in the family Monarchidae. Most species are endemic to islands in Melanesia but the spectacled monarch is widely distributed and occurs in parts of Indonesia and western Australia. The genus was previously lumped together in the genus Monarcha.

Taxonomy and systematics
Based on the results of a molecular phylogenetic study published in 2005, the genus Monarcha was split and 19 species moved to the resurrected genus Symposiachrus that had been introduced by the French naturalist Charles Lucien Bonaparte in 1854 with the spectacled monarch (Symposiachrus trivirgatus) as the type species. The genus name Symposiachrus combines the Ancient Greek συν/sun meaning "together", ποσις/posis meaning "husband" and αχρως/akhrōs meaning "pallid".

The genus Symposiachrus contains the following twenty–one species:
 Black monarch (Symposiachrus axillaris)
 Spot-winged monarch (Symposiachrus guttula)
 Black-bibbed monarch (Symposiachrus mundus)
 Flores monarch (Symposiachrus sacerdotum)
 Louisiade monarch (Symposiachrus melanopterus)
 Boano monarch (Symposiachrus boanensis)
 Spectacled monarch (Symposiachrus trivirgatus)
 Moluccan monarch (Symposiachrus bimaculatus)
 Kai monarch (Symposiachrus leucurus)
 Tanahjampea monarch (Symposiachrus everetti)
 Buru monarch (Symposiachrus loricatus)
 Kofiau monarch (Symposiachrus julianae)
 Biak monarch (Symposiachrus brehmii)
 Hooded monarch (Symposiachrus manadensis)
 Manus monarch (Symposiachrus infelix)
 Mussau monarch (Symposiachrus menckei)
 Black-tailed monarch (Symposiachrus verticalis)
 Solomons monarch (Symposiachrus barbatus)
 Kolombangara monarch (Symposiachrus browni)
 White-collared monarch (Symposiachrus vidua)
 Rufous monarch (Symposiachrus rubiensis)

References

Further reading
David, N., and M. Gosselin. 2011. Gender agreement of avian species-group names under Article 31.2.2 of the ICZN Code. Bulletin of the British Ornithologists' Club 131: 103–115.
Filardi, C.E., and R.G. Moyle. 2005. Single origin of a pan-Pacific bird group and upstream colonization of Australasia. Nature 438: 216–219.
Mayr, E., and J. Diamond. 2001. The birds of northern Melanesia. Speciation, ecology, and biogeography. Oxford University Press.

 
Bird genera
Taxa named by Charles Lucien Bonaparte